Sheikh Niamat Ali (30 April 1940 – 24 November 2003) was a Bangladeshi film director. He won Bangladesh National Film Award for Best Director in 1979, 1985 and 1995 for all the three feature films he ever made - Surja Dighal Bari, Dahan and Anyajiban respectively.

Career
In 1977, Ali and his co-director Masihuddin Shaker started shooting the film Surja Dighal Bari. The film was based on a novel by Abu Ishaque about the rural people in the 1950s. It won five international awards, including Mannheim Film Festival and Portugal Film Society. It was the first film made from Bangladesh government grant.

Filmography
 Surja Dighal Bari (1979)
 Dahan (1985)
 Anya Jibon (1995)

Awards
 Chalachchitram Award 2004

References

External links
 

1940 births
2003 deaths
Bangladeshi film directors
Best Director National Film Award (Bangladesh) winners
Best Screenplay National Film Award (Bangladesh) winners
Best Story National Film Award (Bangladesh) winners
20th-century screenwriters
Film directors from West Bengal